Tex Creek Wildlife Management Area at  is an Idaho wildlife management area in Bonneville County east of Idaho Falls. The WMA land was originally obtained to provide mitigation for the construction of the Ririe and Teton dams. 

The WMA supports moose, elk, mule deer and other game species over range of habitats. There are opportunities for hiking, horseback riding, and hunting in the WMA.

References

Protected areas established in 1976
Protected areas of Bonneville County, Idaho
Wildlife management areas of Idaho